Saint-Leu-d'Esserent is a commune in the Oise department in northern France.

History
During World War II, the caves were one of three major underground V-1 flying bomb storage depots. In addition to the caves, the facility included blockhouses, bunkers, flak emplacements and railway links. Allied intelligence firmly identified late in June 1944 that Saint-Leu-d'Esserent and Nucourt were V-1 storage depots.  On 27 June 1944, Saint-Leu-d'Esserent was initially bombed by the US Army Air Force, then on 4/5 July 1944 by two RAF forces (the first unsuccessfully used Tallboy bombs in an attempt to collapse the limestone roof of the caves).  Finally on 7 July 1944, an evening RAF raid successfully blocked the tunnels.

The storage dump at Thiverny was bombed in 1944 on 5 May,
11 July,
12 July
and 19 July.

See also
 Communes of the Oise department
 V-1 flying bomb (facilities)

References

Communes of Oise
Caves of France
V-weapon subterranea
World War II strategic bombing
World War II sites in France
Landforms of Hauts-de-France